Field Hockey at the 2015 Pacific Games in Port Moresby, Papua New Guinea was held on July 13–18, 2015. The format was changed from the eleven-a-side hockey played at previous South Pacific Games to the five-a-side game.

Men's tournament

Women's tournament

Medal summary

Medal table

Medalists

See also
Field hockey at the Pacific Games

References

2015 Pacific Games
Pacific Games
Field hockey at the Pacific Games